Favartia is a genus of sea snails, marine gastropod mollusks in the family Muricidae, the murex snails or rock snails. It is known for its crystalline shell.

Species
Species within the genus Favartia include:

 Favartia alveata (Kiener, 1842)
 Favartia andamanensis (Houart & Surya Rao, 1996)
 Favartia aporema Houart, 2016
 Favartia aquinoi Houart, 2019
 Favartia balteata (Beck in Sowerby, 1841)
 Favartia barbarae Vokes, 1994
 Favartia bicolor Bozzetti, 2019
 Favartia bojadorensis (Locard, 1897)
 Favartia bractea Houart, 2016
 Favartia brazieri (Angas, 1878)
 Favartia brevicula (Sowerby, 1834)
 Favartia brevispira Bozzetti, 2007
 Favartia burnayi Houart, 1981
 Favartia caitlinae (Petuch & R. F. Myers, 2014)
 Favartia cecalupoi Bozzetti, 1993
 Favartia cellulosa (Conrad, 1846)
 Favartia charlesi Garrigues & Lamy, 2016
 Favartia cirrosa (Hinds, 1844)
 Favartia cocosensis D'Attilio & Myers, 1990
 Favartia colombi Houart & Gori, 2011 
 Favartia coltrorum Houart, 2005
 Favartia concava Garrigues & Lamy, 2019
 Favartia concavoptera (Kosuge, 1980)
 Favartia confusa (Brazier, 1877)
 Favartia conleyi Houart, 1999
 Favartia crouchi (G.B. Sowerby III, 1894)
 Favartia cyclostoma (G.B. Sowerby II, 1841)
 Favartia dalli (Espinosa & Ortea, 2011)
 Favartia deynzeri Houart, 1998<ref></ref>
 Favartia deynzerorum (Petuch, 2013)
 Favartia diomedaea (Dall, 1908)
 Favartia eastorum Houart, 1998
 Favartia edwardpauli (Petuch, 1990)
 Favartia emersoni Radwin & d'Attilio, 1976
 Favartia erosa (Broderip, 1833)
 Favartia exigua (Broderip, 1833)
 Favartia flexirostris (Melvill, 1898)
 Favartia fournierae Houart & Héros, 2013 
 Favartia funafutiensis (Hedley, 1899) 
 Favartia garrettii (Pease, 1868)
 Favartia glypta (M. Smith, 1938)
 Favartia goldbergi Petuch & Sargent, 2011
 Favartia guamensis Emerson & D'Attilio, 1979
 Favartia hebeae (Espinosa & Ortea, 2016)
 Favartia hidalgoi (Crosse, 1869)
 Favartia hilli (Petuch, 1987)
 Favartia humilis (Broderip, 1833)
 Favartia incisa (Broderip, 1833)
 Favartia iredalei Ponder, 1972
 Favartia jacquesi (Espinosa & Ortea, 2016)
 Favartia jeanae Bartsch & D'Attilio, 1980
 Favartia judithae D'Attilio & Bartch, 1980
 Favartia kalafuti (Petuch, 1987)
 Favartia keenae (Vokes, 1970)
 Favartia lappa (Broderip, 1833)
 Favartia laurae (Vokes, 1970)
 Favartia leonae D'Attilio & Myers, 1985
 Favartia levicula (Dall, 1889)
 Favartia lifouensis Houart & Héros, 2012 
 Favartia lindae Petuch, 1987
 Favartia macgintyi (M. Smith, 1938)
 Favartia mactanensis (Emerson & D'Attilio, 1979)
 Favartia maculata (Reeve, 1845)
 Favartia madangensis Houart, 2020
 Favartia mariagordae Espinosa & Ortea, 2016
 Favartia martini (Shikama, 1977)
 Favartia massemeni Merle & Garrigues, 2008
 Favartia mikrostenos Houart, Gori & Rosado, 2017
 † Favartia milleti Ceulemans, van Dingenen, Merle & Landau, 2016 
 Favartia minatauros Radwin & D'Attilio, 1976
 Favartia minirosea (Abbott, 1954)
 Favartia minuta Garrigues & Lamy, 2019
 Favartia morisakii Kuroda & Habe in Habe, 1961
 Favartia natalensis (E. A. Smith, 1906)
 Favartia nivea Houart & Tröndlé, 2008
 Favartia norrisii (Reeve, 1845)
 Favartia nuceus (Mörch, 1850)
 Favartia oscari Espinosa, Ortea & Moro, 2019
 Favartia pacei Petuch, 1988
 Favartia palmeiraensis Espinosa, Ortea & Moro, 2019
 Favartia parthi Houart, 1993
 Favartia paulmieri Houart, 2002
 Favartia paulskoglundi Hertz & Myers, 1998
 Favartia peasei (Tryon, 1880)
 Favartia pelepili D'Attilio & Bertsch, 1980
 Favartia peregrina (Olivera, 1980)
 Favartia perita (Hinds, 1844)
 Favartia phantom (Woolacott, 1957)
 Favartia philcloveri (Houart, 1984) 
 Favartia ponderi Myers & D'Attilio, 1989
 Favartia pseudosalmonea Houart, 2016
 Favartia purdyae Vokes & D'Attilio, 1980
 Favartia radwini (Emerson & D'Attilio, 1970)
 Favartia rosamiae D'Attilio & Myers, 1985
 Favartia rosea Habe, 1961
 Favartia roseotincta Houart & Gori, 2011 
 Favartia salvati Houart & Tröndlé, 2008
 Favartia shaskyi D'Attilio & Myers, 1988
 Favartia striasquamosa Ponder, 1972
 † Favartia suboblonga (d'Orbigny, 1852) 
 Favartia sykesi (Preston, 1904)
 Favartia tantelyi Houart & Héros, 2013 
 Favartia taylorae Petuch, 1987
 Favartia tetragona (Broderip, 1833)
 Favartia varimutabilis Houart, 1991
 Favartia vittata (Broderip, 1833)
 Favartia voorwindei Ponder, 1972
 Favartia vulcana Espinosa, Ortea & Moro, 2019
 Favartia xuani Thach, 2016

References

 
Muricopsinae